Tanygnathus is a genus of parrots in the Psittaculini tribe, of the superfamily of Psittacoidea (true parrots).

Its species are native to Southeast Asia and Melanesia.

Taxonomy
The genus Tanygnathus was introduced by the German naturalist Johann Wagler in 1832. The type species was subsequently designated as the great-billed parrot (Tanygnathus megalorynchos) by the English zoologist George Robert Gray in 1840. The name Tanygnathus combines the Ancient Greek words tanuō "to stretch out" and gnathos "jaw".

The genus contains four species:
 Great-billed parrot, Tanygnathus megalorynchos
 Blue-naped parrot, Tanygnathus lucionensis
 Blue-backed parrot, Tanygnathus everetti
 Black-lored parrot, Tanygnathus gramineus
 Azure-rumped parrot, Tanygnathus sumatranus

Genetic analysis has supported reclassifying all 4 species under Psittacula, making Tanygnathus a synonym of the former genus.

References

 
Psittaculini
Bird genera